George Birge is an American country music artist. From 2013 to 2020, he was one half of the duo Waterloo Revival with Cody Cooper. Birge began recording independently in 2021.

Biography
George Birge was born in Austin, Texas. He began singing when he was 14 years old, and began writing songs with his friend Cody Cooper when both were still teenagers. The two separated after high school, but reunited in 2013 when Cooper returned to Austin to visit his family. From 2013 to 2020, the two recorded on Big Machine Records as the duo Waterloo Revival.

After Waterloo Revival broke up in 2021, Birge began writing songs by himself. This included cuts by Matt Stell and Chris Lane, along with former Rascal Flatts member Gary LeVox. Clay Walker also recorded Birge's songs "Need a Bar Sometimes" and "Catchin' Up with an Old Memory", both of which he released as singles. In late 2021, Walker encouraged Birge to release his songs on the social media platform TikTok. This led to his song "Beer Beer, Truck Truck" gaining attention on the platform late in the year. Due to this song's success, Birge signed with RECORDS Nashville, an independent label in Nashville, Tennessee. He released a single titled "Mind on You" through the label in late 2021, with Michael Knox serving as producer.

"Mind on You" debuted at number 58 on the Billboard Country Airplay chart dated August 8, 2022, peaking at number 51 on the chart in March 2023.

Discography

Extended plays

Singles

References

American male singers
American country singer-songwriters
Country musicians from Texas
Living people
People from Austin, Texas
Year of birth missing (living people)